The Commissioners in Lunacy for Scotland or Lunacy Commission for Scotland were a public body established by the Lunacy (Scotland) Act 1857 to oversee asylums and the welfare of mentally ill people in Scotland.

Previous bodies
The Madhouses (Scotland) Act 1815 established the right of Scottish Sheriffs to order the inspection of madhouses.

Establishment
The Board of Commissioners in Lunacy for Scotland was established in 1857 by the Lunacy (Scotland) Act 1857. There were two Commissioners of Lunacy each paid £1,200 a year and two Deputy Commissioners each paid £600 a year.

Chairmen of the board were as follows:
 1857-1859 William Elliot-Murray-Kynynmound, 3rd Earl of Minto
 1859-1863 William Forbes Mackenzie
 1863-1894 Sir John Don-Wauchope
 1894-1897 Sir Thomas Gibson-Carmichael
 1897-1909 Walter George Hepburne-Scott, 9th Lord Polwarth
 1909-1913 Sir Thomas Mason

The Commissioners themselves were physicians. Mainly based at 51 Queen Street in Edinburgh. These included:

Dr John Fraser FRSE 1895 - 1910

Asylums commissioned
The legislation created a General Board of Commissioners in Lunacy for Scotland. It also created district boards with the power to establish and operate publicly funded "district asylums" for patients who could not afford the fees charged by existing private and charitable "Royal Asylums". These existing "Royal Asylums" (with Royal Charters) were the Aberdeen Royal Lunatic Asylum, the Crichton Royal Institution, the Dundee Royal Lunatic Asylum, the Royal Edinburgh Lunatic Asylum, the Glasgow Royal Lunatic Asylum, the Montrose Royal Lunatic Asylum and James Murray's Royal Lunatic Asylum. The aim of the legislation was to establish a network of "district asylums" with coverage throughout Scotland.

The following asylums were commissioned under the auspices of the Commissioners in Lunacy for Scotland:

Aberdeen District Asylum, 1904
Argyll and Bute District Asylum, 1863
Ayrshire District Asylum, 1869
Banff District Asylum, 1865
East Lothian District Asylum, 1866
Edinburgh District Asylum, 1906
Elgin District Asylum, 1835
Fife and Kinross District Asylum, 1866
City of Glasgow District Asylum, 1896
Glasgow Woodilee District Asylum, 1875
Govan District Asylum, 1895
Inverness District Asylum, 1864
Kirklands District Asylum, 1881
Lanark District Asylum, 1895
Midlothian District Asylum, 1874
Paisley District Asylum, 1876
Perth District Asylum, 1864
Renfrew District Asylum, 1909
Roxburgh District Asylum, 1872
Stirling District Asylum, 1869

In addition the Southern Counties Asylum, which was intended to provide facilities for paupers, was erected on the site of the Crichton Royal Institution (which focused on fee paying patients) in 1849 but subsequently amalgamated with the Crichton Royal Institution. Likewise the Dundee District Asylum, which was intended to provide facilities for paupers, was established alongside the Dundee Royal Lunatic Asylum (which focused on fee paying patients) in 1903 but subsequently amalgamated with the Dundee Royal Lunatic Asylum.

Successors
The Mental Deficiency and Lunacy (Scotland) Act 1913 replaced the Commission with the General Board of Control for Scotland.

See also
Commissioners in Lunacy (for England and Wales)
Commissioners in Lunacy for Ireland

References

Sources

Mental health legal history of the United Kingdom
Defunct public bodies of the United Kingdom